This is a list of ships of the Indian Navy. It covers both the pre-independence Royal Indian Navy and the post-independence Indian Navy.

Current ships

Historical ships
Note:  Prior to 1950, Indian naval ships carried the prefix HMIS ("His Majesty's Indian Ship") as the Indian Armed Forces were under the British Crown. After the declaration of the Republic of India on 26 January 1950, the prefix became INS ("Indian Naval Ship").

Aircraft carriers

Submarines

Cruisers

Destroyers

Frigates

Corvette

Minesweepers

Fast Attack Craft

Amphibious Warfare Ships

Auxiliaries

 HMIS Parvati 
 HMIS Netravati

Patrol Ships

See also

 Indian navy related
 Aircraft of the Indian Navy
 List of active Indian Navy ships
 List of Indian naval aircraft
 List of Indian Navy bases
 List of submarines of the Indian Navy

 Indian military related 
 India-China Border Roads
 Indian military satellites
 List of active Indian military aircraft
 List of Indian Air Force stations
 India's overseas military bases
 Indian Nuclear Command Authority

References

Sources
 Collins, J.T.E. The Royal Indian Navy, 1939–1945. Official History of the Indian Armed Forces in the Second World War. New Delhi: Combined Inter-Services Historical Section (India & Pakistan), 1964.
 Parkes, Oscar. Jane's Fighting Ships 1931. Newton Abbot, Devon, UK:Davis & Charles Reprints, 1931 (1973 reprint). .
 
 
 
 
 Moore, John (Ed). Jane's Fighting Ships 1980–81. Jane's. 1980. 

Naval ships of India
Indian Navy
Ships of the Indian Navy